Christopher Williams (born 17 March 1983) is an English cricketer.  Williams is a left-handed batsman who bowls right-arm medium-fast.  He was born at Rochford, Essex.

Williams represented the Essex Cricket Board in a single List A match against the Surrey Cricket Board in the 2nd round of the 2003 Cheltenham & Gloucester Trophy which was held in 2002.  In his only List A match, he scored 7 runs.

References

External links
Chris Williams at Cricinfo
Chris Williams at CricketArchive

1983 births
Living people
People from Rochford
Sportspeople from Essex
English cricketers
Essex Cricket Board cricketers